Sapzurro is a small town on the Caribbean Sea located in the northwest corner of the Republic of Colombia. It is part of the Municipality of Acandí, in the Chocó Department of the Darién region.  The closest city is Capurganá, a semi-popular port town, and it is across the international boundary from the Panamanian town of La Miel.

History 
Sapzurro was founded in 1889 by Afro-Colombian settlers Gumercindo Medrano and Juana Caraballo, who arrived from the Barú Peninsula (Bolívar Department of Colombia). Later the settlers Feliciano Berrío arrived with Caridad Casiano, Juan de Dios Meza with Bonifacia Bravo, and some time later, Eliseo Zúñiga (Cuna), Mariano Pereira and Asención Pertúz, mostly from Bocachica and who are the main family members of this family community.

Accessibility 
There is ferry service between the Antonio Roldán Betancourt Airport (Apartadó Town) and Capurganá.  The Turbo-Capurganá route has become popular for people crossing between Colombia and Panama.  Daily boats transport passengers from Turbo to Capurganá then they have the option to walk or take a smaller panga to the small port of Sapzurro.

Traveling out 
The first city in Panama is Puerto Obaldia, accessible by boat from Capurganá or Sapzurro in about 45 minutes.  From inside the country there are flight connections from Medellín in the Enrique Olaya Herrera Airport with the aviation companies  ADA and Searca.

Geography

Climate 
Tropical savanna climates have monthly mean temperatures above 18 °C (64 °F) in every month of the year and typically a pronounced dry season, with the driest month having precipitation less than 60mm (2.36 in) of precipitation.  Köppen Climate Classification subtype for this climate is "Aw". (Tropical Savanna Climate).  The average temperature for the year in Sapzurro is 81.0 °F (27.2 °C). The warmest month, on average, is May with an average temperature of 82.0 °F (27.8 °C). The coolest month on average is January, with an average temperature of 80.0 °F (26.7 °C).

Demographics 
There are 270 inhabitants, most sharing one of two last names. It is inhabited predominantly by descendants of African slaves brought by the Spanish Colonizers after conquering the Americas.

Guerrilla presence 
Due to military tension the FARC guerillas, including the FARC's Frente 57, were forced to take refuge across their own border in Panama's Darién region.  In June 1999 the guerrillas briefly took over the border settlement of Sapzurro.

Etymology 
Origins of the word Sapzurro come from the ancient dialect of the Kuna people and means "Bahia Profunda" (deep bay).

Gallery

See also 
 Darién Gap

References

External links 

 http://www.sapzurro.net/ (SPANISH)
 UK Guardian article: Development by the guidebook
 http://www.sapzurrocolombia.com/en (English)

Populated places in the Chocó Department
Underwater diving sites in the Caribbean
Underwater diving sites in Colombia